Blue Origin NS-22  was a sub-orbital spaceflight mission, operated by Blue Origin, which launched on 4 August 2022 using the New Shepard rocket.  It was Blue Origin's sixth crewed flight and the twenty-second overall to go into space.

Crew
The NS-22 crew was nicknamed "Titanium Feather".

The crew of six included Sara Sabry, who became the first Egyptian person in space, and Mário Ferreira, who became the first Portuguese person in space. Also onboard was Coby Cotton, one of the co-founders of American YouTube channel Dude Perfect. Cotton's flight was sponsored by MoonDAO, a cryptocurrency company. He won Model Rocket Battle 3. (However, he would have went either way as Garrett Hilbert, who would have either won or place second due to his rocket exploding and not being able to tell how high it was, forfeited his seat as he was a "Gravity Guy".)

The crew also included American British explorer Vanessa O'Brien, who became the first woman to complete the Explorers' Extreme Trifecta, which involves travelling to the bottom of the Challenger Deep, the summit of Mount Everest, and flying into outer space.

References

Space tourism
2022 in spaceflight
Suborbital human spaceflights
2022 in Texas
New Shepard missions